Wilhelm Josef Ritter von Thoma (11 September 1891 – 30 April 1948) was a German army officer who served in World War I, in the Spanish Civil War, and as a general in World War II. He was a recipient of the Knight's Cross of the Iron Cross.

Thoma is known for his indiscretion while a POW in  British captivity, when he unwittingly revealed the existence of the V-1 flying bomb and the V-2 weapons programmes. He was subject to surveillance by  British intelligence and while speaking to another German officer, was recorded discussing rockets that were being tested at Kummersdorf West, which he had observed while on a visit that also included Generalfeldmarschall Walther von Brauchitsch, the Commander-in-Chief of the Army. British reconnaissance flights over Peenemünde Army Research Center in May and June 1943 brought back unmistakable images of rockets at the facility; the subsequent bombing of the site severely disrupted the programme.

Military career
Wilhelm Ritter von Thoma was born in Dachau in 1891. He was the son of a Bavarian tax official and became a career officer with the Bavarian Army. Thoma took part in the first World War with 3rd Bavarian Infantry Regiment (part of 2nd, then, from 1915, 11th Bavarian Infantry Division) on the Western (1914/15/16/17/18) and Eastern Front (1915/16), the Serbian Campaign (1915) and the Romanian Front in 1916/17. During the Second Battle of the Marne in July 1918 he was captured by French-American forces and became a prisoner of war until September, 1919.
He was decorated with the Knight's Cross of the Bavarian Military Max Joseph Order, the highest military decoration for bravery in the Bavarian Army and was awarded the noble title of Ritter.

After the war, Thoma remained in the new German army, the Reichswehr. During the Spanish Civil War, and now a colonel, he commanded the ground element of the Condor Legion, following the German intervention on the side of the Nationalists under by Francisco Franco. He became an advisor on tank warfare to Field Marshal Walther von Brauchitsch. He commanded tanks in the field during the Battle of France and was intended to hold a senior role in Operation Sealion, the planned invasion of Britain.

During  Operation Barbarossa, the invasion of the Soviet Union in 1941, Thoma led the 17th Panzer Division. He then commanded the 20th Panzer Division in the Battle of Moscow and after. In December 1941, Thoma received the Knight's Cross of the Iron Cross. 

In September 1942, he was transferred to North Africa to take over command of the Afrika Korps, replacing Walther Nehring, who had been wounded. When Panzer Army Africa commander Stumme died on 24 October during the Second Battle of El Alamein, Thoma took command until Rommel returned on 26 October. On 4 November, Thoma was captured at Tel-el-Mapsra as the Allies pursued the retreating Axis forces.

Under British surveillance as POW
On 4 November 1942, Thoma was captured by the British forces and was taken directly to Trent Park,  known as the "Cockfosters Cage", a Combined Services Detailed Interrogation Centre prisoner of war facility for senior officers operated by MI19 and equipped with an "M Room" listening facility to secretly record and translate the conversations of the inmates.

Trent Park held high-ranking enemy officers prisoner in comfortable, but secretly monitored, conditions. While there Thoma was recorded speaking to another POW, General Ludwig Crüwell discussing rockets that were being tested at Kummersdorf West, which he had observed while on a visit that also included Field Marshal Walther von Brauchitsch, the Commander-in-Chief of the Army and other technical programme details.

Following his indiscretion, further British reconnaissance flights over Peenemünde in May and June 1943 brought back unmistakable images of rockets at the facility which was developing guided missiles and long-range ballistic missiles better known as the V-1 flying bomb and the V-2 ballistic missile. When reconnaissance and intelligence information regarding the V-2 became convincing, Churchill's War Cabinet directed the first planned raid (Operation Hydra), the attack of Peenemünde in August 1943, as part of Operation Crossbow, the Anglo-American campaign against the Vergeltungswaffe, the German long-range weapons programme.

Trent Park also intercepted, when he stated that "every bomb, every piece of material and every human life that is still wasted in this senseless war, (is) too bad (zu schade). The only gain, that war brings us, is that... the ten-year gangstergovernment comes to an end". Later he continued: "It would be a shame if one of them got shot. They should be made to forced labor until they peg out(verrecken)."

The British intelligence files describe von Thoma as; "very intelligent and exceedingly well-read... a striking personality and is violently anti-Nazi". He led the anti-Nazi faction at Trent Park and was appointed "camp leader" by the British following the departure of Crüwell to a camp in Canada in the summer of 1944.

In late 1945, Waffen-SS commander Kurt Meyer, captured in Belgium in September 1944 while commanding the 12th SS-Panzer Division "Hitlerjugend", arrived at Trent Park and noted that Thoma, the German camp leader, was "...highly thought of by the English. Relations between him and the guards is excellent".

Post war
In 1946 Thoma's leg was amputated while he was still in British captivity. He was repatriated later that year. Thoma lived in his hometown of Dachau until his death of a heart attack in 1948.

Reception
Churchill's high regard for Thoma is evident from his many later quotations of Thoma's opinions on strategic matters, especially in his book about the war. After Montgomery invited Thoma to dine with him in his private trailer, Churchill remarked: "I sympathize with General von Thoma: Defeated, in captivity and... (long pause for dramatic effect) dinner with Montgomery".

Awards
(First World War)
 Iron Cross, 2nd Class, 17 October 1914 
 Iron Cross, 1st Class, 3 June 1915
 Military Order of Max Joseph, Knight's Cross, 5 July 1916
 Military Merit Order, 4th Class with Swords, 16 November 1914
 Austrian Military Merit Cross, 3rd Class with War Decoration, 5 April 1916
 Wound Badge 1918 version in Silver, 22 November 1916
 Honour Cross of the World War 1914/1918, early 1935
(Spanish Civil War)
 German Spanish Cross in Gold with Swords and Diamonds
 Spanish Military Medal with Diamonds
 Spanish Campaign Medal
 Condor Legion Tank Badge, in Gold. Unique version of the standard silver badge, presented by the men of his command at the Nationalist Victory Day Parade in Madrid on 19 May 1939.
(Second World War)
 Wehrmacht Long Service Award, 4th–1st class
 Clasp to the Iron Cross, 1st class
 Clasp to the Iron Cross, 2rd class
 Eastern Front Medal, mid 1942 
 Knight's Cross of the Iron Cross on 31 December 1941 as Generalmajor and commander of the 20th Panzer Division

Notes

References

Citations

Bibliography

 
 
 
 
 
 
 

1891 births
1948 deaths
People from Dachau
Opposers who participated in the Beer Hall Putsch
Generals of Panzer Troops
Condor Legion personnel
Military personnel from Bavaria
People from the Kingdom of Bavaria
Recipients of the Knight's Cross of the Iron Cross
Knights of the Military Order of Max Joseph
Recipients of the clasp to the Iron Cross, 1st class
German prisoners of war in World War II held by the United Kingdom
World War I prisoners of war held by France
German prisoners of war in World War I
Reichswehr personnel
German Army personnel of World War I